Mrs. Miniver is a 1942 American romantic war drama film directed by William Wyler, and starring Greer Garson and Walter Pidgeon. Inspired by the 1940 novel Mrs. Miniver by Jan Struther, it shows how the life of an unassuming British housewife in rural England is affected by World War II. Produced and distributed by Metro-Goldwyn-Mayer, its supporting cast includes Teresa Wright, Dame May Whitty, Reginald Owen, Henry Travers, Richard Ney and Henry Wilcoxon.

It was a critical and a commercial success, becoming the highest-grossing film of 1942 and winning six Academy Awards, including Best Picture, Best Director, Best Actress (Garson), and Best Supporting Actress (Teresa Wright). It was the first film centered on World War II to win Best Picture, and the first to receive five acting nominations.

A sequel, The Miniver Story (1950) was made with Greer Garson and Walter Pidgeon reprising their roles.

Plot
Kay Miniver (Greer Garson) and her family live a comfortable life at a house called "Starlings" in Belham, a fictional village outside London. The house has a large garden, with a private landing stage on the River Thames at which is moored a motorboat belonging to her devoted husband, Clem (Walter Pidgeon), a successful architect. They have three children: the youngsters Toby (Christopher Severn) and Judy (Clare Sandars), and an older son, Vin (Richard Ney), a student at Oxford University. They have live-in staff: Gladys, the housemaid (Brenda Forbes), and Ada, the cook (Marie De Becker).

As World War II looms, Vin returns from the university and meets Carol Beldon (Teresa Wright), granddaughter of Lady Beldon (Dame May Whitty) from nearby Beldon Hall. Despite initial disagreements—mainly contrasting Vin's idealistic attitude to class differences with Carol's practical altruism—they fall in love. As the war comes closer to home, Vin feels he must "do his bit", and enlists in the Royal Air Force, qualifying as a fighter pilot. He is posted to a base near to his parents' home and can signal his safe return from operations to his parents by "blipping" his engine briefly (rapidly open and closing the throttle, which results in short, sharp roars of sound) as he flies over the house. Vin proposes to Carol in front of his family at home, after his younger brother prods him to give a less romantic, but more honest, proposal than he had envisioned. Together with other boat owners, Clem volunteers to take his motorboat, the Starling, to assist in the Dunkirk evacuation.

Early one morning, Kay, unable to sleep as Clem is still away, wanders down to the landing stage. She is startled to discover a wounded German pilot (Helmut Dantine) hiding in her garden, and he takes her to the house at gunpoint. Demanding food and a coat, the pilot aggressively asserts that the Third Reich will mercilessly overcome its enemies. She feeds him, calmly disarms him when he collapses, and then calls the police. Soon after, Clem returns home, exhausted, from Dunkirk.

Lady Beldon visits Kay to try and convince her to talk Vin out of marrying Carol on account of her granddaughter's comparative youth at age eighteen. Kay reminds her that she, too, had been young—sixteen, in fact—when she married her late husband. Lady Beldon concedes defeat and realizes that it would be futile to try to stop the marriage. Vin and Carol marry; Carol has now also become a Mrs. Miniver, and they return from their honeymoon in Scotland. A key theme is that she knows Vin is likely to be killed in action, but their short love will fill her life. Later, Kay and her family take refuge in their Anderson shelter in the garden during an air raid, and attempt to keep their minds off the frightening bombing by reading Alice's Adventures in Wonderland, which Clem refers to as a "lovely story". They barely survive as a bomb destroys part of Starlings. The Minivers take the damage with nonchalance.

At the annual village flower show, Lady Beldon silently disregards the judges' decision that her rose is the winner. Instead, she announces that the rose entered by the local stationmaster, Mr. Ballard (Henry Travers), named the "Mrs. Miniver", as the winner, with her own Beldon Rose taking second prize. As air raid sirens sound and the villagers take refuge in the cellars of Beldon Hall, Kay and Carol drive Vin to join his squadron. On their journey home, they witness fighter planes in a dogfight. For safety, Kay stops the car, and they see a German plane crash. Kay realizes Carol has been wounded by machine-gun fire from the plane, and takes her back to Starlings. She dies a few minutes after they reach home. Kay is devastated. When Vin returns from battle, he already knows the terrible news. Ironically, he is the survivor, and Carol the one who died.

The villagers assemble at the badly damaged church where their vicar affirms their determination in a powerful sermon:

A solitary Lady Beldon stands in her family's church pew. Vin moves to stand alongside her, united in shared grief, as the members of the congregation rise and stoically sing "Onward, Christian Soldiers". The camera pans to empty sky showing through the gaping hole in the bombed church's roof. Underscored by a full orchestra triumphantly playing “Land of Hope and Glory,” flight after flight of RAF fighters in the V-for-Victory formation depart to face the enemy.

Cast

 Greer Garson as Kay Miniver
 Walter Pidgeon as Clem Miniver
 Teresa Wright as Carol Beldon
 Dame May Whitty as Lady Beldon
 Reginald Owen as Foley
 Henry Travers as Mr. Ballard
 Richard Ney as Vin Miniver
 Henry Wilcoxon as the Vicar
 Christopher Severn as Toby Miniver
 Brenda Forbes as Gladys (Housemaid)
 Clare Sandars as Judy Miniver
 Marie De Becker as Ada
 Helmut Dantine as German flyer
 John Abbott as Fred
 Connie Leon as Simpson
 Rhys Williams as Horace
 Peter Lawford as a pilot (uncredited)
 Charles Bennett as milkman (uncredited)
 Harry Allen as William (uncredited)
 Billy Bevan as bus conductor (uncredited)

Production
The film entered pre-production in the autumn of 1940, when the United States was still a neutral country. Over the several months the screenplay was written, the U.S. moved closer to war. As a result, scenes were rewritten to reflect Americans' increasingly pro-British and anti-German outlooks. For example, the scene where Mrs. Miniver confronts a downed German flyer in her garden was made more confrontational with each new version.

Following the Japanese attack on Pearl Harbor that brought the U.S. into the war, the garden scene was re-filmed to reflect the tough, new spirit of a nation at war. The key difference was that in the new version of the scene, filmed in February 1942, Mrs. Miniver was allowed to slap the flyer across the face. The film was released 4 months later.

Wilcoxon and director William Wyler "wrote and re-wrote" the key sermon scene the night before it was shot. The speech "made such an impact that it was used in essence by President Roosevelt as a morale builder and part of it was the basis for leaflets printed in various languages and dropped over enemy and occupied territory". Roosevelt ordered the film rushed to the theaters for propaganda purposes. The sermon dialogue was reprinted in Time and Look magazines.

Reception

Critical response
Mrs. Miniver was a quintessential Hollywood film In terms of its directing, acting, esthetics and technology; yet it had a profound impact on British audiences. Historian Tony Judt wrote that it was "a very English tale of domestic fortitude and endurance, of middle-class reticence and perseverance, set symptomatically around the disaster at Dunkirk where all these qualities were taken to be most on display—[it] was a pure product of Hollywood. Yet for the English generation that first saw it the film would long remain the truest representation of national memory and self-image.

On Rotten Tomatoes, the film holds an approval rating of 94% based on 63 reviews, with an average rating of 7.8/10. The website's critical consensus reads: "An excessively sentimental piece of propaganda, Mrs. Miniver nonetheless succeeds, due largely to Greer Garson's powerful performance."

In 2006, the film was ranked No. 40 on the American Film Institute's list of the most inspiring American films of all time. In 2009, it was named to the National Film Registry by the Library of Congress as "culturally, historically, or aesthetically" significant:

Of the 592 critics polled by American magazine Film Daily, 555 named it the best film of 1942.

Reactions to propaganda elements
Joseph Goebbels, minister of Nazi propaganda, wrote:
 
The propaganda angle was cited—perhaps naively—by Variety in its 1942 review:

Box office
Mrs. Miniver exceeded all expectations, grossing $5,358,000 in the US and Canada and $3,520,000 abroad. In the United Kingdom, it was named the top box office attraction of 1942. The initial theatrical release earned a profit of $4,831,000, making it MGM's most successful film to that time.

Awards and nominations

Sequel and adaptations
 In 1943, the film was adapted into an episode of the Lux Radio Theatre. That episode in turn was popular enough to inspire a 5-day a week serial, starring radio veteran Trudy Warner on CBS.
 In 1950, a film sequel, The Miniver Story, was made with Garson and Pidgeon reprising their roles.
 In 1960, a 90-minute television adaptation directed by Marc Daniels was broadcast on CBS, with Maureen O'Hara as Mrs. Miniver and Leo Genn as Clem Miniver.
In 2015, a musical adaptation was written and presented at a community theater in Little Rock, Arkansas.

In popular culture
In 1944 American rose grower Jackson & Perkins introduced Rosa 'Mrs. Miniver', a medium-red hybrid tea rose, named after Mr. Ballard's winning rose in the film. Over time the rose was lost to cultivation. In 2015, one remaining plant was located in a German garden by Orlando Murrin, a gardener in Exeter, UK. In 2016 it was successfully propagated by St Bridget's Nurseries in Exeter and returned to commerce in 2017.

The fifth episode of season 1 of Downton Abbey copies the scene of Lady Beldon giving her award away at a flower show, with Maggie Smith's Violet Crawley in place of Lady Beldon.

In the play A Raisin in the Sun, Brother, Ruth, and Beneatha give Mama (Lena) a gift with the note "To our own Mrs. Miniver – Love from Brother, Ruth, and Beneatha".

Notes

References

Further reading

 Christensen, Jerome. "Studio Identity and Studio Art: MGM, Mrs. Miniver, and Planning the Postwar Era." ELH (2000) 67#1 pp: 257–292. online
 Glancy, Mark. When Hollywood Loved Britain: The Hollywood 'British' Film (1999).
 Grayzel, Susan R. "“Fighting for the idea of home life”: Mrs Miniver and Anglo-American representations of domestic morale." in Gender, Labour, War and Empire (Palgrave Macmillan, London, 2009) pp. 139-156.
 Herman, Jan. A Talent for Trouble: The Life of Hollywood's Most Acclaimed Director (1995). 
 Koppes, Clayton R., and Gregory D. Black. Hollywood Goes to War: Patriotism, Movies, and the Second World War from Ninotchka to Mrs. Miniver (Tauris Parke Paperbacks, 2000)
 Short, K. R. M. "'The White Cliffs of Dover': promoting the Anglo-American Alliance in World War II." Historical Journal of Film, Radio and Television (1982) 2#1 pp: 3-25.
 Summerfield, Penny. "Dunkirk and the Popular Memory of Britain at War, 1940—58." Journal of contemporary history 45.4 (2010): 788–811.
 Troyan, Michael. A Rose for Mrs. Miniver: The Life of Greer Garson (2010)

External links

 
 
 
 
 
 
 
 
 
 Mrs. Miniver on Lux Radio Theater: December 6, 1943
 BBC Radio 4 - And The Academy Award Goes To ... Mrs Miniver, Series 5 Episode 1
 Tickets on Sale: Mrs. Miniver

1942 films
1940s war drama films
American romantic drama films
American World War II propaganda films
Films directed by William Wyler
Films scored by Herbert Stothart
Films scored by Daniele Amfitheatrof
Best Picture Academy Award winners
Battle of Britain films
American black-and-white films
Dunkirk evacuation films
Films featuring a Best Actress Academy Award-winning performance
Films featuring a Best Supporting Actress Academy Award-winning performance
Films set in country houses
Films set in the 1930s
Films set in the 1940s
Films set on the home front during World War II
Films whose cinematographer won the Best Cinematography Academy Award
Films whose director won the Best Directing Academy Award
Films whose writer won the Best Adapted Screenplay Academy Award
American war drama films
United States National Film Registry films
Metro-Goldwyn-Mayer films
Films set in England
1942 romantic drama films
1940s English-language films